The flag of the State of Azawad, an unrecognized state that declared independence from Mali on 6 April 2012, is a horizontal green-red-black tricolour with a yellow triangle at the hoist. The symbolism behind colours to the Azawadi people are manifold as described by Moussa Ag Assarid: yellow representing the Sahara desert (in Tamacheq "tenere"), black representing the arduous history of the Tuaregs connected to anti-colonial struggle in their many uprisings as well as their difficult way of life, red representing the blood of the Azawadi martyrs and green which represents the scant vegetation  in its Saharan and Sahelian regions. It is the same as the flag of the National Movement for the Liberation of Azawad. A popular variation of the flag includes a red "yaz" or "ⵣ" letter in Tifinagh that serves as a universal symbol of the Amazigh people within its yellow hoist. This version has a more specific reference to the Tuareg demographic in Azawad versus the Fulani, Songhai and Moorish ethnicities present.

History
During previous Tuareg rebellions two different flags were proposed for Azawad. One was a blue and white horizontal bicolour with a red triangle at the hoist, and the other was a plain white flag with a blue crescent and star.

See also
Pan-African colours
Berber flag
French Sudan
Tuareg rebellion (disambiguation)

References

External links

Azawad
Azawad
Flags of Mali